Ragged Point is a headland on California's Central Coast. It is located at the southern end of Big Sur in northern San Luis Obispo County. The Ragged Point Inn and Resort is located in the area, which, as with much of Big Sur, features seaside cliffs, beaches, and hiking trails.

Description 
The rocky headland marks the southern end of the small bay where San Carpoforo Creek empties into the Pacific Ocean. There is a short beach just north of the outcropping called Ragged Point Beach, which is separated by a rock from the San Carpoforo Creek Beach and the San Carpoforo Creek Trail. The area around Ragged Point is home to various forms of wildlife, including elephant seals, sea otters, and birds such as the Western snowy plover.

The resort was built by Wiley and Mildred Ramey starting in the late 1950s on property that was formerly part of the Hearst Ranch. The modern resort includes a hotel, restaurant, and wedding facilities, and it provides access to Young Creek Beach, a black sand beach accessible by a steep hike down a  cliff.

See also 
San Carpóforo Canyon

References

External links 
 Ragged Point Inn and Resort

Headlands of California
Landforms of San Luis Obispo County, California
Big Sur